Ilarvirus is a genus of positive-strand RNA viruses in the family Bromoviridae. Plants serve as natural hosts. There are 22 species in this genus.

Structure
Viruses in the genus Ilarvirus are non-enveloped, with icosahedral and quasi-spherical geometries, and T=3 symmetry. The diameter is around 29 nm. Genomes are linear and have three segments.

Life cycle
Viral replication is cytoplasmic and lysogenic. Entry into the host cell is achieved by penetration into the host cell. Replication follows the positive-strand RNA virus replication model in the cytoplasm. Positive strand RNA virus transcription, using the internal initiation model of subgenomic RNA transcription is the method of transcription. The virus exits the host cell by tubule-guided viral movement. Plants serve as the natural host. Transmission routes are mechanical inoculation by insects and plant to plant contact.

Taxonomy
The following species are assigned to the genus:

 Ageratum latent virus
 American plum line pattern virus
 Apple mosaic virus
 Asparagus virus 2
 Blackberry chlorotic ringspot virus
 Blueberry shock virus
 Citrus leaf rugose virus
 Citrus variegation virus
 Elm mottle virus
 Fragaria chiloensis latent virus
 Humulus japonicus latent virus
 Lilac leaf chlorosis virus
 Lilac ring mottle virus
 Parietaria mottle virus
 Privet ringspot virus
 Prune dwarf virus
 Prunus necrotic ringspot virus
 Spinach latent virus
 Strawberry necrotic shock virus
 Tobacco streak virus
 Tomato necrotic streak virus
 Tulare apple mosaic virus

References

External links
 
 ICTV Report: Bromoviridae
 Viralzone: Ilarvirus

Bromoviridae
Virus genera